Warblewo  (formerly German Warbelow) is a village in the administrative district of Gmina Polanów, within Koszalin County, West Pomeranian Voivodeship, in north-western Poland. 

The village has a population of 70.

References

Warblewo